Güçlü is a village in the Cizre District of Şırnak Province in Turkey. The village is populated by Kurds of the Amara and Meman tribes and had a population of 1,093 in 2021.

The two hamlets of Kolgezer and Sarıtarla are attached to Güçlü.

References 

Villages in Cizre District
Kurdish settlements in Şırnak Province